The 1997 Pan Arab Games football tournament was the 8th edition of the Pan Arab Games men's football tournament. The football tournament was held in Beirut, Lebanon between 13–27 July 1997 as part of the 1997 Pan Arab Games.

Participating teams
Eight teams took part to the tournament, Kuwait participated with the reserve team and United Arab Emirates with the U21 team.
The following countries have participated for the final tournament:

Squads

Group stage

Group A

Group B

Knockout stage

Semifinals

Third place Match

Final

Final ranking

References

External links
8th Pan Arab Games, 1997 (Beirut, Lebanon) – rsssf.com

football
1997
1997 in African football
1997 in Asian football
1997